The Oklahoma Gazette is a free alt-weekly paper distributed throughout the Oklahoma City metro area via more than 800 rack locations and via its official website. It covers local and statewide news dealing with city government, education, politics, sustainability, food, restaurants, theater, and music. A notable feature of the Oklahoma Gazette is its Chicken-Fried News, where interesting, weird and obscure news from around the state is highlighted.

Staff  
Publisher & Editor
Matt Dinger

Associate Publisher
Kelsey Lowe

Creative Director
Berlin Green

References

External links
 Oklahoma Gazette Web Site

1979 establishments in Oklahoma
Alternative weekly newspapers published in the United States
Newspapers established in 1979
Newspapers published in Oklahoma City